Mbay is a small town on the north coast of Flores Island, Indonesia, which serves as the administrative capital of Nagekeo Regency (within East Nusa Tenggara Province). It comprises two villages (desa) which together cover 48.54 km2 and had a combined population of 5,624 at the 2020 Census.

References

Populated places in East Nusa Tenggara
Regency seats of East Nusa Tenggara
Flores Island (Indonesia)